Washington's 10th legislative district is one of forty-nine districts in Washington state for representation in the state legislature. The district includes all of Island County, the northwestern tip of Snohomish, and the southwestern part of Skagit counties. Cities in the district include Oak Harbor, Coupeville, Langley, Mount Vernon, La Conner, and Stanwood.

The mostly rural district is represented by state senator Ron Muzzall (R) and state representatives Clyde Shavers (D; position 1), and Dave Paul (D; position 2).

List of Washington House of Representatives

Position 1

See also
Washington Redistricting Commission
Washington State Legislature
Washington State Senate
Washington House of Representatives
Washington (state) legislative districts

References

External links
Washington State Redistricting Commission
Washington House of Representatives
Map of Legislative Districts

10